Namco is a town and township in Damxung County in the Lhasa Prefecture of Tibet.  It means something like "Heaven Lake". It was established in 1960 and became a township in 1970.  Is located in the north of Damxung county. The economy is based on animal husbandry, mainly shepherding goats, sheep, cattle,  horses etc.

References

Populated places in Lhasa (prefecture-level city)
Damxung County